This is a list of former stations on the Chicago "L". This list includes stations that have been demolished, partially demolished, and stations that are abandoned, but are not open for passenger service.

The majority of these stations existed on now demolished "L" lines, but some exist on current lines.

Stations

Reopened stations

Notes
Station remained in service on the North Shore Line after the "L" withdrew service.
Station remained in service on the Chicago Aurora and Elgin after the "L" withdrew service.
Station opened on the Aurora Elgin and Chicago Railway prior to the start of "L" service. March 11, 1905, is the day "L" service began at this station.
Station opened on the Milwaukee Road's Evanston branch prior to the start of "L" service. May 16, 1908, is the day "L" service began at this station.

References

Stations On The L, Former

Chicago El stations
Chi
Elevated Railway Stations